Raymundo Damasceno Assis (born 15 February 1937) is a Brazilian cardinal of the Roman Catholic Church. He was Auxiliary Bishop of Brasília from 1986 to 2004 and Archbishop of Aparecida from 2004 to 2016.

Biography

Early life and ordination
Damasceno Assis was born 15 February 1937 in Capela Nova. In 1948, he entered the Juvenato São José of the Marist Brothers, in the city of Mendes where he completed his basic elementary education; then he discerned that his vocation was for the priesthood and returned home to Conselheiro Lafaiete, archdiocese of Mariana, where the family had moved. In 1955, he entered the Minor Seminary of the archdiocese of Mariana, where he did his secondary studies; and then the Major Seminary, where he studied philosophy. In 1960, Archbishop Oscar de Oliveira, of Mariana, sent him to the newly established archdiocese of Brasília, as a help to that new local church, inaugurated on 21 April of that same year. In 1961, Brasília's archbishop, sent him to Rome to study theology at the Pontifical Gregorian University, where he obtained a licentiate; he resided at Colegio Pio Brasileiro during those years, the Second Vatican Council was occurring. In 1965, he was sent to Germany, where he concluded his formation at the Superior Institute of Catechesis in Münich. He returned to Brazil in 1968. He did post graduate studies in the philosophy of science at the University of Brasília and at the Pontifical Catholic University of Minas Gerais.

He was ordained a priest on 19 March 1968, in Conselheiro Lafaiete, by José Newton de Almeida Baptista, archbishop of Brasília. In the archdiocese of Brasília, he served as coordinator of catechesis; pastor of the parish of Santíssimo Sacramento. He also served as chancellor and was co-founder and professor of the Major Seminary Nossa Senhora de Fatima and at the same time professor in the Department of Philosophy of the University of Brasília.

Bishop
He was appointed titular bishop of Nova Petra and auxiliary bishop of Brasília on 18 June 1986. He was named metropolitan Archbishop of Aparecida 28 January 2004. In 2007 he was elected to a four-year term as president of the Episcopal Council of Latin America (CELAM).

Cardinal
Benedict XVI created him Cardinal-Priest of Immacolata al Tiburtino in the consistory of 20 November 2010.

In 2011 he was elected to a four-year term as president of the National Conference of Bishops of Brazil (Confêrencia Nacional dos Bispos do Brasil).

He was one of the cardinal electors who participated in the 2013 papal conclave that selected Pope Francis.

Pope Francis accepted his retirement on 16 November 2016 and named Orlando Brandes to succeed him.

References

External links

 
 Biography at Salvador Miranda's site
 Biography at GCatholic.org

Living people
1937 births
Pontifical Gregorian University alumni
21st-century Roman Catholic archbishops in Brazil
Brazilian cardinals
Cardinals created by Pope Benedict XVI
People from Minas Gerais
Roman Catholic archbishops of Aparecida
Roman Catholic bishops of Brasília